Pararowing (or adaptive rowing) is a category of rowing race for those with physical, visual or intellectual disabilities.

History
In 1913, rowing for individuals with disabilities was initiated by headmaster George Clifford Brown at Worcester College for the Blind in Great Britain. Brown encouraged blind students to participate in particular sports in which they would be able to compete at an equal level to sighted players and do so without modifications. Other organizations dedicated to rehabilitating the blind, such as St. Dunstan's Hostel, started rowing clubs shortly afterwards in 1915. Competitive rowing with blind rowers first began in 1914 between Worcester College and the Old Boys in one race and Worcester College and Worcester Boy Scouts in another race the same year. 

In October 1945, veterans from the United States Army, Navy, and Marines blinded during WWII entered into the Navy Day Regatta on the Schuylkill River in Philadelphia. Some consider this event as the catalyst for international interest of adaptive rowing.

Classes

Under FISA rules there are three categories for adaptive rowers:

PR3 (previously LTA – Legs, Trunk, Arms) Use of at least one leg, trunk and arms. Also for those with visual and intellectual impairments. Rowed with standard boats and sliding seats.
PR2 (previously TA – Trunk and Arms) Only use of trunk muscles. Boat has fixed seat.
PR1 (previously AS – Arms and Shoulders) Limited trunk control. Boat has fixed seat and rower is strapped at upper chest level to only allow shoulder and arm movements.

Events
At FISA World Championships there are now 9 boat events (standard nomenclature is used).

Racing was held over 1,000 m (rather than the standard 2,000 m), but from 2017 the distance was changed to the standard 2,000m. In mixed events half the crew must be male and other half female (coxswain may be of either gender and may be able bodied). Single shells for the PR1 category must have stabilising pontoons attached to the riggers.

Adaptive events were added to the World Rowing Championships in 2002 and took place at the 2008 Summer Paralympics in Beijing, China.

References

External links

FISA Para-Rowing page
Adaptive Rowing on International Paralympic Committee website
Rowing Canada's Para-Rowing Page
British Rowing's (UK) Domestic Adaptive Rowing Page
USRowing's Domestic Adaptive Rowing Page

Rowing
Paralympic sports